Norman Turner Leavitt (December 1, 1913 – December 11, 2005) was an American film and television actor.

Life and career 
Leavitt was born in Lansing, Michigan. He began his stage career in 1935, appearing as a wedding guest in the Broadway play How Beautiful With Shoes.

Leavitt made his film debut in 1941. in 1946 he appeared in The Harvey Girls. During the 1940s and 1950s he mainly appeared in films in uncredited and supporting roles.

Films he appeared in during the 1950s and 1960s including It's a Dog's Life, The Long, Long Trailer, Stars and Stripes Forever, Somebody Loves Me, The Merry Widow, Hannah Lee: An American Primitive, O. Henry's Full House, California Passage, Mr. Belvedere Rings the Bell, Harvey, The Killer That Stalked New York, Wabash Avenue, The Inspector General, A Woman of Distinction, Off Limits, The Luck of the Irish, Showdown at Boot Hill, God Is My Partner, Valerie, The Way to the Gold, The Shadow on the Window, The Ten Commandments, Fury at Gunsight Pass, Ride, Vaquero!, Living It Up, The Kentuckian and When Gangland Strikes, Combat Squad, The Rookie, and Teenage Monster.

Leavitt started appearing on television in 1952 in The Adventures of Kit Carson. In 1958 Leavitt played the recurring role of the dimwitted jail handyman Ralph in the western television series Trackdown.

In the 1960s and 1970s Leavitt started appearing in more television programs and fewer films. His television credits include Gunsmoke, The Twilight Zone, Mayberry, R.F.D., Perry Mason, The Fugitive, The Beverly Hillbillies, Petticoat Junction, Green Acres, The Man from U.N.C.L.E., Bonanza, Lost in Space, The Wild Wild West, The Jack Benny Program, Mister Ed, Death Valley Days, The Rifleman, Leave It to Beaver, Peter Gunn, The Addams Family, Wagon Train, Tales of Wells Fargo, The Millionaire, The Guns of Will Sonnett and Ironside. He also appeared in The Andy Griffith Show, playing a number of different roles.

Leavitt retired in 1978, last appearing in the television series Quincy, M.E..

Death 
Leavitt died in December 2005 of dehydration and dementia at the Motion Picture and Television Hospital in Solvang, California, at the age of 92. His body was cremated.

Filmography

Film

Television

References

External links 

Rotten Tomatoes profile

1913 births
2005 deaths
Male actors from Lansing, Michigan
American male film actors
American male television actors
20th-century American male actors
Male Western (genre) film actors
Western (genre) television actors